I Love You Perfect is the soundtrack album for the TV movie of the same name, composed and performed by Yanni. The album peaked at #13 on Billboard's "Top New Age Albums" chart in 1996.

Track listing

References

External links
Official Website

Yanni albums
1995 soundtrack albums
Film soundtracks